The Paraguay women's national beach handball team is the national team of Paraguay. It takes part in international beach handball competitions.

World Championships results
2018 – 8th place

Other Competitions
2019 South American Beach Games – 
2019 South and Central American Beach Handball Championship - 
2022 South and Central American Beach Handball Championship - 4th

Youth team results
2022 South and Central American Youth Beach Handball Championship - 4th
2022 South American Youth Games - 4th

References

External links
IHF profile

Women's national beach handball teams
Beach handball